Sobantu Shootings Stars, is a South African football club based in the Sobantu township, which is a small suburb situated 4 km from the city centre of Pietermaritzburg. The club currently play in the KwaZulu-Natal province of Vodacom League.

External links
SAFA Official Website -database with results of Vodacom League

SAFA Second Division clubs
Soccer clubs in KwaZulu-Natal